Carolina Verónica Ruiz Castillo (born 14 October 1981) is a retired World Cup alpine ski racer from Spain. Born in Osorno, Chile, she represented Spain in four Winter Olympics and eight World Championships. She moved to Spain with her parents few weeks after she was born, specifically to Sierra Nevada (Granada). She also competed in the European cup and the junior world championships, where she won two medals.

Ruiz Castillo secured her first World Cup victory in 2013, a downhill at Méribel, France. It was the first-ever victory in a World Cup speed event for Spain and the second career podium for Ruiz Castillo at age 31; her first was thirteen years earlier in a giant slalom.

World Cup results

Top ten finishes
 1 win – (1 DH) 
 2 podiums – (1 DH, 1 GS) 
 14 top tens – (9 DH, 4 SG, 1 GS)

Season standings

Standings through 4 Nov 2015

Olympic results

References

External links
 
 Carolina Ruiz Castillo World Cup standings at the International Ski Federation
 
 
 Carolina Ruiz Castillo at SalomonRacing.com
  

1981 births
Living people
People from Osorno, Chile
Alpine skiers at the 2002 Winter Olympics
Alpine skiers at the 2006 Winter Olympics
Alpine skiers at the 2010 Winter Olympics
Alpine skiers at the 2014 Winter Olympics
Chilean emigrants to Spain
Spanish female alpine skiers
Olympic alpine skiers of Spain